The 1925 season of Auckland Rugby League was its 16th. On 30 March Auckland Rugby League held its fifteenth annual meeting with 200 in attendance. The strong financial position of the league was commented on. It was also decided that if possible the Senior Grade would be split into A and B divisions owing to the increasing number of teams who wished to enter but also the gap in standard between the best teams and the worst.

Trophy winners 
City Rovers won the First Grade Championship for the 7th time in just 15 seasons. Ponsonby won the Roope Rooster Knockout competition for the 4th time in the 11 seasons it had been competed for. Ponsonby also won the Stormont Shield after defeating City in the final in its inaugural season.

While in the B division Ellerslie won the inaugural title and were awarded the Norton Cup. At the end of the season these teams competed for their own knockout trophy which was named the Stallard Cup. It was won by Otahuhu who defeated Northcote in the final.

In the lower grades Richmond Rovers dominated like they were to come to do for many seasons. They won the 2nd grade, 3rd grade, and both sections of the 6th grade. They were a very powerful club at the junior level and this would ultimately lead to great success at the senior grade level.

Representative season 
The Auckland team played in 5 matches with a number of other Auckland B and Auckland C team matches. They played against the New Zealand team twice and the touring Queensland side who they drew with 18 all. The Auckland side claimed the Northern Union Challenge Cup off the holders, South Auckland and they retained it against the same opponents in a later match. In addition the Auckland Provincial team played Queensland but were soundly beaten 54–14.

Death of Bill Stormont and inauguration of the Stormont Shield 
On June 4 William Stormont (known better as Bill Stormont) died, succumbing to rheumatic heart disease. Stormont had played for the Marist Old Boys senior team from 1920 to 1924 scoring 24 tries and kicking 31 goals. He had also represented Auckland on 16 occasions, scoring 4 tries and kicking 2 goals as well as playing 3 matches for New Zealand in 1920. He had been ill for quite some time and had not played for Marist since the end of the 1924 season. The funeral was on the Sunday leaving his parents residence in Epsom and progressing to Purewa Cemetery where he was buried. The match between Marist and Richmond Rovers on Saturday was originally postponed but was never played. The matches at Carlaw Park saw one minutes silence before kickoff. On July 9 at the New Zealand Council meeting John Stormont presented a shield to be played for among the senior clubs. It was to be known as the “William Stormont Memorial Shield”.

On July 22 at an Auckland Management Committee meeting it was decided that the shield would be played for by the “winners of the senior grade club competition and the winners of the Roope Rooster”. A request came in for the trophy to be played for among champion teams from around the country but it was eventually settled that it would be for Auckland teams. The championship winning City Rovers team, the Roope Rooster winning Ponsonby United, and Stormont's Marist side were the three teams chosen to compete for it. City drew the bye so Ponsonby were to come up against Marist in the ‘semi-final’ match. Ponsonby defeated Marist 23–22 to progress to the Stormont Shield final. Ponsonby then trounced City Rovers 35–3 in the final to become the first team with their name on the trophy. The Stormont Shield is still played for today though it is played for in round 1 of the regular season with the Fox Memorial grand finalists from the previous year competing for it.

Monteith Shield (first grade championship)

Monteith Shield standings
{|
|-
|

Monteith Shield fixtures
Prior to the kickoff in the Round 7 games at Carlaw Park on 6 June, the teams stood in silence for one minute as a mark of respect for the late William Stormont who had died two days earlier. He was a World War I veteran and had played for Marist from 1920 to 1924.

Round 1

Round 2

Round 3

Round 4 
Sam Lowrie was ordered off in the match between Ponsonby and Devonport.

Round 5

Round 6

Round 7 
The match between Marist and Richmond scheduled to be played at Victoria Park was cancelled due to the death of recent Marist player Bill Stormont two days earlier.

Round 8

Round 9 
Jim O'Brien for Marist and Tom Haddon for Devonport were ordered off for fighting in their match at Carlaw Park.
In one of the more amazing team efforts in early Auckland rugby league history the City team saw all 13 of its players score points in a 57–10 victory over Athletic. There were nine different try scorers and the four who didn't cross the line all kicked at least one conversion.

Round 10

Round 11

Round 12

Round 13

Round 14

Roope Rooster knockout competition

Round 1

Semi finals

Final

Stormont Memorial Shield

Semi final

Final

Top try scorers and point scorers (senior grade and Roope Rooster)

B Grade standings and results

B Grade standings

B Grade fixtures
In Kingsland's debut in the grade Claude List in his debut season in first grade scored 3 tries in their win over Northcote. He repeated the feat 2 weeks later against Mangere. He would later become the first ever player to represent New Zealand whilst playing for ostensibly a 'second grade' team.

The round 15 match between Kingsland and Otahuhu was not played due to the poor condition of the field at the Auckland Domain.

Stallard Cup knockout competition
This was the first season with a B Division in the First Grade competition and at the end of the season a knockout competition was played between the five teams.

Final

Lower grades 
There were 6 lower grade competitions in 1925 below the B Division with the 6th grade split into an A and B division.

Second grade
Richmond defeated Ponsonby A 15-3 on September 5 of the championship final. They also won the knockout competition beating Ponsonby A 30-2 on October 3. Ellerslie and Kingsland withdrew after 4 rounds, United Suburbs after 5 rounds, and City after 7 rounds.
{|
|-
|

Third grade
City Rovers secured the championship when they defeated Ponsonby B on September 19 in round 18. They played Northcote in the knockout final on October 3 but no result was reported. Otahuhu withdrew from the competition after a round 8 default, while Coromandel Old Boys withdrew after round 10.
{|
|-
|

Fourth grade
Richmond Rovers won the competition undefeated. When they secured the title on September 19 they were a full 6 points clear of their nearest rival according to newspaper reports. Parnell were second and it is likely that they won more matches than the 10 that were reported. City withdrew after 1 round, New Lynn and Newton B after 2 rounds, and Marist B after 4 rounds. There were many results that were unreported so the table is incomplete. Richmond beat Athletic in the knockout final on October 10 by 5 points to 3.
{|
|-
|

Fifth grade
It is unknown who won the 5th grade championship as it was not reported in any of the newspapers. Using the results reported City Rovers had the most wins but approximately half of the results were not reported so the table is incomplete. City did win the knockout final 16 to 13 on October 10 over Parnell. Parnell had defeated Northcote & Birkenhead Ramblers 9 to 3 in one semi final, while City defeated Marist in the other by 24 to 5. Athletic withdrew after 12 rounds. Newton entered a team but it is unknown if they played a match as they withdrew after round one.
{|
|-
|

Sixth grade A
Richmond won the championship with an undefeated season. They also won the knockout competition when they beat Devonport 8 to 0 in the final on September 19. Marist withdrew from the competition after 2 rounds. Less than half of the results were reported in the newspapers so the standings are incomplete. It appears that Leys Institute were affiliated to the Ponsonby club as they were usually reported as Leys Institute in the official fixture lists on Thursdays in the newspapers but as Ponsonby by the newspapers on Monday when they reported scores.
{|
|-
|

Sixth grade B
City won the championship. Richmond A won the knockout competition when they beat United Suburbs who had joined the competition late in the season by 32 points to 0.
{|
|-
|

Exhibition matches
On 19 April, when Marist had a bye in the first round of the club competition they travelled to Christchurch and played Marist of Christchurch. They won by 16 points to 7. The match also marked the opening of Monica Park.

Exhibition match

Labour Day carnival

Representative season
The Auckland representative team had a busy season. After a series of 3 trial matches on 27 June both the New Zealand team and Auckland teams were selected. Officials had declared that "give us fine weather and we will get an attendance of 20,000". Unfortunately the weather did not oblige and it was in fact described as "the worst experienced this season ... in one place there was a miniature lake." This resulted in a crowd many times smaller, however thousands came into the ground to watch the main match between North Island and South Island, won by the former 27 points to 9. Auckland then played against the New Zealand team and lost 9 points to 16. Following this they played a Northern Union Challenge Cup match against the holders South Auckland and were victorious by 24 points to 16. After the New Zealand team returned from their tour of Australia they again played Auckland at Carlaw Park and they used the experience they had gained to trounce Auckland by 41 points to 17, employing tactics that the Auckland team were not prepared for. Two weeks later Auckland played Queensland who were being touted as the finest league team in the world at the time in the first of three matches. They drew the first, before narrowly losing the second and then being well and truly outclassed in the 3rd match by 54 points to 14.

Representative fixtures
After the trial matches were played the New Zealand team was selected by Mr Liversedge, Pearce, and Harding, and 14 Auckland players made the side. They were: Craddock Dufty, Charles Gregory, Lou Brown, Hec Brisbane, Frank Delgrosso, Jack Kirwan, Bert Laing, Maurice Wetherill, Wilson Hall, Stan Webb, Bert Avery, Ernie Herring, Jim O'Brien, and Horace Dixon. The following day Sam Lowrie of Ponsonby United was added to the touring side.

Inter-Island match

Auckland Trial match

Auckland C v South Auckland

Auckland v New Zealand

Auckland v South Auckland (Northern Union C.C.)

Auckland v New Zealand

Auckland B v West Coast

Auckland v Queensland 
In the match reports the newspapers did not distinguish between the two Jim O'Brien's. It is more likely that the try scored was by Jim O'Brien purely because he was playing in the second row (despite often playing at prop) and was more involved in the loose play which the try itself came from. The try came after a kick was chased by Maurice Wetherill.

Auckland B v Canterbury

Auckland B v Wellington

Auckland v South Auckland (Northern Union C.C.) 
Claude List became the first player selected from the B Division to make the full Auckland representative side. He played for the Kingsland Rovers club and had been mentioned as being as good as any player in his position in New Zealand rugby league. He was to go on to represent New Zealand from 1928 to 1932 and play senior club football into the 1940s.

Auckland Province v Queensland

Auckland representative matches played and scorers
This list only includes the Auckland team games and does not include the Auckland B, Auckland C, and Auckland Province matches.

References

External links
 Auckland Rugby League Official Site

Auckland Rugby League seasons
Auckland Rugby League